The Walk  at Jumeirah Beach Residence is a 1.7-kilometre strip at the ground and plaza level of the Jumeirah Beach Residence complex in Dubai, United Arab Emirates. It was developed by Dubai Properties Group, and was completed in 2007 and opened officially in August 2008.

The Walk is one of Dubai’s outdoor and tourist attractions, with activities such as street painting, recycled art displays, comedy shows, sand sculptures, photography displays, and booths selling fashion accessories and crafts. It is located adjacent to Hilton Dubai Jumeirah and Hilton Dubai The Walk, which opened their doors in October 2000, introducing Dubai’s ‘golden mile’ in Jumeirah to the signature service and quintessential hospitality associated with the Hilton Worldwide Resorts brand.

See also
 List of shopping malls in Dubai

References

External links
 The Walk Dubai Guide
 Official page on Facebook 

2008 establishments in the United Arab Emirates
Buildings and structures completed in 2007
Shopping malls established in 2008
Shopping malls in Dubai